Fight For Japan: Genki Desu Ka Omisoka 2011, also known as Fight for Japan. How are you! New Year! 2011  was a mixed martial arts, puroresu and kickboxing event in the annual New Year's Eve event promoted by FEG, M-1 Global and the Inoki Genome Federation that took place on December 31, 2011 at the Saitama Super Arena in Saitama, Japan.

Background
The event included bouts that encompassed the Dream, K-1 World MAX and IGF banners. The event aired live on HDNet in North America, SKY PerfecTV! in Japan, and also online through Nico Nico Douga.

The semi-finals and finals of Dream's World Bantamweight Grand Prix were held at this event.

The Nagashima/Kikuno mixed rules bout consisted of a three-minute first round under K-1 rules and a five-minute second round under Dram rules.

Kazushi Sakuraba was rumoured to be involved in a puroresu bout on this card.

Tim Sylvia was expected to face Brett Rogers at this event, however the bout was scrapped because Rogers was unable to obtain a visa to enter Japan.

Results

World Bantamweight Grand Prix 2011 Bracket

References

Dream (mixed martial arts) events
K-1 events
2011 in Japanese sport
2011 in kickboxing
2011 in mixed martial arts
Kickboxing in Japan
Sport in Saitama (city)
M-1 Global events
December 2011 sports events in Japan